Dylan Playfair is a Canadian actor from Fort St. James, British Columbia. He is most noted for his starring role as Reilly in Letterkenny.

Early life 
Playfair comes from a hockey family. Before becoming an actor, Playfair played hockey as a forward for the Merritt Centennials of the BCHL. He is the son of former NHL player Jim Playfair and nephew of Larry Playfair.

Career
Playfair started his acting his career in children's film and television. Beginning in 2014 he played Knox in the YTV series Some Assembly Required for all 3 seasons until the show was cancelled in 2016. In 2017, Playfair joined Disney's Descendants franchise playing the role of Gil, Gaston's son, in Descendants 2 and Descendants 3. 

Playfair has often acted in roles involving hockey, due in part to his skating skills. In 2013 he acted, alongside his future Letterkenny co-star Andrew Herr, in Mr. Hockey: The Gordie Howe Story as Gordie Howe's son Marty Howe. In 2016 Playfair started work on the hit Canadian show Letterkenny, as Reilly, one of the town's jocks. He has also toured North America as part of the Letterkenny Live! tour. Playfair had earlier played the same character in the Letterkenny web series. This 'typecasting' has continued, as he joined the cast of The Mighty Ducks: Game Changers as Coach T.

Filmography

Film

Television

References

External links

Canadian male film actors
Canadian male television actors
Year of birth missing (living people)
Living people
21st-century Canadian male actors
Male actors from British Columbia